Kristin Cullmann (born 23 June 1955) is a Swedish orienteering competitor. She is two times Relay World Champion as a member of the Swedish winning team in 1974 and 1976, as well as having a silver medal from 1978. She obtained silver in the Individual World Championships in 1974 and 1976.

References

1955 births
Living people
Swedish orienteers
Female orienteers
Foot orienteers
World Orienteering Championships medalists
20th-century Swedish women